William Collins (1760–1819) was an English naval officer and an early settler in Tasmania, Australia. In April 1804 he was appointed Hobart's first harbour master. He established Australia's first whaling station at Ralphs Bay, Tasmania, in 1805.

References

1756 births
1819 deaths
People who died at sea
Deaths from cholera
Australian ship owners
Sealers
Australian people in whaling